The 1926 Smethwick by-election was a by-election held on 21 December 1926 for the British House of Commons constituency of Smethwick in Staffordshire (now in the West Midlands county).

The by-election was caused by the resignation of the town's Labour Party Member of Parliament (MP), John Davison, who had represented the constituency since its creation for the 1918 general election.

The result was a victory for the Labour candidate Oswald Mosley, who held the seat comfortably with a slightly increased share of the vote. He represented Smethwick until the 1931 general election, having left Labour in early 1931 to found the New Party. The New Party was unsuccessful, and the following year he founded the British Union of Fascists.

Result

References

See also 
 List of United Kingdom by-elections (1918–1931)
 Smethwick constituency
 1945 Smethwick by-election

1926 in England
1926 elections in the United Kingdom
By-elections to the Parliament of the United Kingdom in West Midlands (county) constituencies
Smethwick
By-elections to the Parliament of the United Kingdom in Staffordshire constituencies
20th century in Staffordshire